Steven Craig Watson (born 1 April 1974) is an English football manager and former professional player. He was formerly the manager of  club Chester.

As a player, he was a right-back or midfielder. He played in the Premier League and Football League for Newcastle United, Aston Villa, Everton, West Bromwich Albion and Sheffield Wednesday. He was capped once by the England national B team, having previously played twelve times and scored once for the under-21s.

Watson moved into coaching after retiring from playing and was appointed as an academy coach at Huddersfield Town under former teammate Lee Clark in 2010. He then followed Clark to Birmingham City before a spell as assistant manager of Macclesfield Town. He was given his first managerial role in 2017 when he joined Gateshead, before becoming York City manager in 2019. He left the club in 2021 before joining Chester the same year.

Playing career

Newcastle United
Watson was born in North Shields, Tyne and Wear. He began his career with Newcastle United, playing on a regular basis. At the time of his first-team debut, as a substitute in a 2–1 defeat to Wolverhampton Wanderers on 10 November 1990, he was the youngest person ever to play for Newcastle, a record that still stands. Watson appeared 24 times that season, firstly under Jim Smith and then under Ossie Ardiles as Newcastle struggled in the Second Division.

Watson featured prominently during the 1991–92 season as Kevin Keegan returned to Newcastle and relegation to the Third Division was avoided. During his seven years at the club, he wore a jersey with every shirt number 2–11 at least once, earning a reputation as a key all round capable footballer integral to The Entertainers style of play. He came on as a 77th-minute substitute at Wembley Stadium in the 1998 FA Cup Final, in which Newcastle were beaten 2–0 by Arsenal.

Aston Villa, Everton and West Bromwich Albion
Watson was transferred to Aston Villa for £4 million in October 1998. He scored once for Villa, in a 4–0 home win over Southampton on 1 December 1999 in the League Cup.

He moved to Everton on 4 July 2000 on a five-year contract for a £2.5 million transfer fee. When boss Walter Smith found his squad decimated by injury, Watson was used a striker alongside Tomasz Radzinski, a role he had started to play at the beginning of his career before transferring to the defence. His time with Everton was blighted with injury, although he did enjoy some time in the first team for the 2003–04 season, which included three goals against Leeds United on 28 September 2003. This made him the first Everton player to score a hat-trick in any competition since Nick Barmby in February 2000.

Watson signed for West Bromwich Albion on 5 July 2005 on a three-year contract on a free transfer, after rejecting the offer of a new one-year contract with Everton. He made his debut as an 80th-minute substitute in a 0–0 draw away to Manchester City on 13 August. His only goal for the club came on 2 January 2006, with a shot that came after receiving the ball from Jonathan Greening in the 77th minute of a 2–1 home defeat to Aston Villa.

Sheffield Wednesday

Watson joined Sheffield Wednesday on 9 February 2007 on loan until the end of the 2006–07 season, with opportunities at West Brom limited. He made his debut the following day, starting in a 1–1 draw away to Burnley. Before he joined them, Wednesday had lost five matches in a row. However, they won six, drew four and only lost once when Watson was in the team. He was re-called by West Brom on 26 April with two matches remaining as cover for the injured Curtis Davies and the suspended Neil Clement. Watson signed for Wednesday permanently on 10 July 2007 on a free transfer. His first goal for the club came on 6 November with an equaliser in the fifth minute of stoppage time as Wednesday drew 1–1 away to West Brom.

Watson succeeded Lee Bullen as club captain for the 2008–09 season, taking charge of off-the-field matters, with Richard Wood retaining his role as team captain and being responsible for on-the-field affairs. Watson scored the winner in the Steel City derby against Sheffield United on 19 October; his volleyed lob over Paddy Kenny in the 35th minute gave Wednesday a 1–0 win. Sheffield Wednesday decided to release Watson on 14 May 2009 due to long-term injury problems. He subsequently retired from playing.

Coaching and managerial career
Watson was appointed as the new Development Coach at League One club Huddersfield Town on 13 November 2010, joining up with his former Newcastle teammate Lee Clark. Watson was appointed as a coach at Birmingham City of the Championship on 24 August 2012. He was dismissed along with Clark on 20 October 2014. He was appointed as the assistant manager at National League club Macclesfield Town on 4 July 2016.

Watson was appointed as the manager of National League club Gateshead on 10 October 2017. He was appointed as the manager of National League North club York City on 10 January 2019, succeeding Sam Collins who was dismissed with the team 15th in the table. Watson was joined at the club by Micky Cummins, his assistant at Gateshead. He was awarded the National League North Manager of the Month award for October 2021 after three wins from four in the league. He left the club on 13 November.

Watson was appointed manager of National League North club Chester on 23 December 2021, initially on a contract until the end of the 2021–22 season. On 28 April 2022, the club confirmed that Watson would leave his role as manager at the end of the season by mutual consent.

Career statistics

Managerial statistics

Honours

As a player
Newcastle United
FA Cup runner-up: 1997–98

As a manager
Individual
National League North Manager of the Month: October 2021

References
Infobox statistics
England U21: 
England B: 

Specific

External links

Profile at the Chester F.C. website

1974 births
Living people
Sportspeople from North Shields
Footballers from Tyne and Wear
English footballers
England youth international footballers
England under-21 international footballers
England B international footballers
Association football defenders
Association football midfielders
Newcastle United F.C. players
Aston Villa F.C. players
Everton F.C. players
West Bromwich Albion F.C. players
Sheffield Wednesday F.C. players
English Football League players
Premier League players
FA Cup Final players
English football managers
Gateshead F.C. managers
York City F.C. managers
Chester F.C. managers
National League (English football) managers
Association football coaches
Huddersfield Town A.F.C. non-playing staff
Birmingham City F.C. non-playing staff
Macclesfield Town F.C. non-playing staff